St. Dominic de Guzman Minor Basilica is a Roman Catholic  Minor basilica located in the City of San Carlos, Pangasinan, Philippines. The church, made out of bricks or ladrillo, used to be the largest Catholic church in the Philippines during the late 18th century, The church was finished in 1773, under the administration of Father Cristobal Ausina. However, it was destroyed by three earthquakes in 1789, 1796, and 1799.

History
The first site of the Saint Dominic de Guzman Parish Church was built at the western side of the Agno River (near Zambales) where the town of Binalatongan (renamed as San Carlos in 1764) was originally located. The church was destroyed by fire in September 1587. The church was reconstructed at the eastern part of the river, also known as the town of Baloydaan. For the second time, the church was damaged by a fire incident on August 4, 1718. The town of Baloydaan, or town of Binalatongan, was transferred to its present site at Pangasinan and was renamed as San Carlos in 1764.

The construction of the new church was finished in a span of three years (from 1770 up to 1773) under the administration of Father Cristobal Ausina. However, series of earthquakes from 1796, 1798, and 1799, heavily damaged the church. The height of its walls were lowered and its foundations were strengthened with buttresses. However, the church, together with its convent, was caught up into fire in 1822. The fourth reconstruction of the church was eventually done before 1864. Father Alvarez Carrozal initiated the rehabilitation of the church from 1878 up to 1890. The bell tower was also erected during his time.

Architectural features
The church resembles a Baroque architectural style. The third and fourth levels form a large pediment with the raking cornice consisting of huge scrolls. The topmost level was painted with the picture of Saint Dominic. The middle segment gives contrast within the levels through the designs along its wall planes.

Present condition

On August 8, 1989, Doña Conseelo S. Perez and Governor Rafael M. Colet, together with Archbishop Federico G. Limon and Mayor Douglas D. Soriano, unveiled the marker of the St. Dominic de Guzman Parish Church.

Marker from the National Historical Commission of the Philippines

References

External links

Roman Catholic churches in Pangasinan
San Carlos, Pangasinan
Basilica churches in the Philippines
Churches in the Roman Catholic Archdiocese of Lingayen–Dagupan